Sycamore Island is an alluvial island in the Allegheny River parallel to Ninemile Island in the borough of Blawnox, Allegheny County in the U.S. state of Pennsylvania.

Sycamore Island is the last remaining privately owned undeveloped island in Allegheny County.  The island hosts a unique floodplain hardwood forest – among the most rare plant community types globally. The Allegheny County Natural Heritage Inventory included Sycamore Island as part of the “Allegheny River Biological Diversity Area” which has a ranking of High Significance.

On December 28, 2007, Allegheny Land Trust acquired the  Sycamore Island with Colcom Foundation providing full funding for its conservation. “The conservation of Sycamore Island through the generous support of the Colcom Foundation ensures that this undeveloped island and its ecological, educational and recreational benefits will be forever protected,” said Roy Kraynyk, Executive Director of the Allegheny Land Trust.  “This is an extremely exciting project,” said Colcom Program Director Carol Zagrocki. “Sycamore Island is truly a rare conservation opportunity in the county.”

References

 Allegheny Trust - Sycamore Island
 "Island on Allegheny bought, will be preserved"

External links
U.S. Army Corps of Engineers, Pittsburgh District

River islands of Pennsylvania
Islands of the Allegheny River in Pennsylvania
Islands of Allegheny County, Pennsylvania
Protected areas of Allegheny County, Pennsylvania
Private islands of the United States